Alligator Lake is a freshwater lake in Osceola County, Florida. In addition to alligators, it is home to largemouth bass, bluegill, bowfin, gar and redear sunfish. The lake is also known as the "Headwaters of the Everglades" despite its original name John Cordall Lake.

References

External links

Lakes of Osceola County, Florida
Lakes of Florida